Miguel Ferreira de Sousa (born 19 September 1998) is a Portuguese footballer who plays for Mafra as a midfielder.

Football career
On 28 December 2021, Miguel Sousa made his Primeira Liga debut with Marítimo in a match against Vizela, coming on as a substitute in the 84th minute. Sousa made his first appearance in the starting line-up in a match against Gil Vicente on 20 March 2022.

On 5 January 2023, Miguel Sousa signed with Mafra until June 2024.

References

1998 births
Footballers from Lisbon
Living people
Portuguese footballers
Association football defenders
C.D. Pinhalnovense players
FC Stumbras players
C.S. Marítimo players
C.D. Mafra players
Primeira Liga players
Liga Portugal 2 players
Campeonato de Portugal (league) players
Portuguese expatriate footballers
Expatriate footballers in Lithuania
Portuguese expatriate sportspeople in Lithuania